A Stonyhurst disk is a transparent circular grid with lines of longitude and latitude that can overlay a solar image to reference the positions of  sunspots. This overlay system was originally created at the Stonyhurst College observatory.

References

Astronomical instruments
Stonyhurst College